Patrick Taval (May 4, 1956 – April 29, 2013) was the Roman Catholic bishop of the Diocese of Kerema, Papua New Guinea.

Ordained to the priesthood in 1984, Taval was named Auxiliary Bishop of Rabaul, Papua New Guinea, and Titular Bishop of Thimida in 1999. He became Coadjutor Bishop of Kerema, Papua New Guinea, in March 2010 and then Bishop of Kerema in 2013. 

Taval died in 2013 while in office.

Notes

1956 births
2013 deaths
21st-century Roman Catholic bishops in Papua New Guinea
20th-century Roman Catholic bishops in Papua New Guinea
Roman Catholic bishops of Kerema
Roman Catholic titular bishops
Roman Catholic bishops of Rabaul